Elwyn Ralph Berlekamp (September 6, 1940 – April 9, 2019) was a professor of mathematics and computer science at the University of California, Berkeley. Berlekamp was widely known for his work in computer science, coding theory and combinatorial game theory.

Berlekamp was the inventor of the algorithm to factor polynomials, and was one of the inventors of the Berlekamp–Welch algorithm and the Berlekamp–Massey algorithms, which are used to implement Reed–Solomon error correction.

Berlekamp had also been active in investing, and ran Axcom, which became Renaissance Technologies' Medallion Fund.

Life and education
Berlekamp was born in Dover, Ohio. His family moved to Northern Kentucky, where Berlekamp graduated from Ft. Thomas Highlands high school in Ft. Thomas, Campbell county, Kentucky. While an undergraduate at the Massachusetts Institute of Technology (MIT), he was a Putnam Fellow in 1961.  He completed his bachelor's and master's degrees in electrical engineering in 1962.  Continuing his studies at MIT, he finished his Ph.D. in electrical engineering in 1964; his advisors were Robert G. Gallager, Peter Elias, Claude Shannon, and John Wozencraft.

Berlekamp had two daughters and a son with his wife Jennifer. He lived in Piedmont, California and died in April 2019 at the age of 78 from complications of pulmonary fibrosis.

Career
Berlekamp was a professor of electrical engineering at the University of California, Berkeley from 1964 until 1966, when he became a mathematics researcher at Bell Labs.  In 1971, Berlekamp returned to Berkeley as professor of mathematics and computer science, where he served as the advisor for over twenty doctoral students.

He was a member of the National Academy of Engineering (1977) and the National Academy of Sciences (1999). He was elected a Fellow of the American Academy of Arts and Sciences in 1996, and became a fellow of the American Mathematical Society in 2012. In 1991, he received the IEEE Richard W. Hamming Medal, and in 1993, the Claude E. Shannon Award.  In 1998, he received a Golden Jubilee Award for Technological Innovation from the IEEE Information Theory Society.  Along with Tom M. Rodgers he was one of the founders of Gathering 4 Gardner and was on its board for many years. In the mid-1980s, he was president of Cyclotomics, Inc., a corporation that developed error-correcting code technology.

He studied various games, including dots and boxes, Fox and Geese, and, especially, Go.  Berlekamp and co-author David Wolfe describe methods for analyzing certain classes of Go endgames in the book Mathematical Go.

Berlekamp and Martin Gardner
Berlekamp was a close friend of Scientific American columnist Martin Gardner and was an important member of the gifted and diverse group of people that Gardner nurtured and acted as a conduit for; people who inspired Gardner and who were in turn inspired by him. Berlekamp teamed up with John Horton Conway and Richard K. Guy, two other close associates of Gardner, to co-author the book Winning Ways for your Mathematical Plays, leading to his recognition as one of the founders of combinatorial game theory. The dedication of their book says, "To Martin Gardner, who has brought more mathematics to more millions than anyone else."

Berlekamp and Gardner both had great love for and were strong advocates of recreational mathematics. Conferences called Gathering 4 Gardner (G4G) are held every two years to celebrate the Gardner legacy. Berlekamp was one of the founders of G4G and was on its board of directors for many years.

Selected publications
 Block coding with noiseless feedback.  Thesis, Massachusetts Institute of Technology, Dept. of Electrical Engineering, 1964.
 Algebraic Coding Theory, New York: McGraw-Hill, 1968.  Revised ed., Aegean Park Press, 1984, .
 (with John Horton Conway and Richard K. Guy)  Winning Ways for your Mathematical Plays.
1st edition, New York: Academic Press, 2 vols., 1982; vol. 1, hardback: , paperback: ; vol. 2, hardback: , paperback: .
2nd edition, Wellesley, Massachusetts: A. K. Peters Ltd., 4 vols., 2001–2004; vol. 1: ; vol. 2: ; vol. 3: ; vol. 4: .
 (with David Wolfe) Mathematical Go. Wellesley, Massachusetts: A. K. Peters Ltd., 1994.  .
 The Dots-and-Boxes Game.  Natick, Massachusetts: A. K. Peters Ltd., 2000.  .

See also

 Berlekamp switching game
 Berlekamp–Zassenhaus algorithm

References

External links
 Elwyn Berlekamp home page at the University of California, Berkeley.
.

1940 births
2019 deaths
20th-century American mathematicians
21st-century American mathematicians
American information theorists
Coding theorists
Combinatorial game theorists
Fellows of the American Academy of Arts and Sciences
Fellows of the American Mathematical Society
Go (game) researchers
MIT School of Engineering alumni
Mathematicians from Ohio
Mathematics popularizers
Members of the United States National Academy of Engineering
Members of the United States National Academy of Sciences
People from Dover, Ohio
Putnam Fellows
UC Berkeley College of Engineering faculty
Deaths from pulmonary fibrosis